TSV Krähenwinkel/Kaltenweide is a German association football club from Langenhagen, Lower Saxony.

History 
The club was founded in 1910. Its biggest success was the win of the Lower Saxony Cup in 1991 and the subsequent qualification for the 1991–92 DFB-Pokal, where they were eliminated in the second round against SSV Reutlingen after receiving a bye for the first round. Since 2015, the club plays in the sixth-tier Landesliga Hannover.

Honours 
The club's honours:
 Lower Saxony Cup
 Champions: 1991

References

External links 
 Official website

Football clubs in Germany
Football clubs in Lower Saxony
Association football clubs established in 1910
1910 establishments in Germany